The Piashti River is a salmon river in the Côte-Nord region of the province of Quebec, Canada. It empties into the Gulf of Saint Lawrence.

Location

It is between the basins of the Corneille River to the west and the Quetachou River to the east.
The basin is partially in the unorganized territory of Lac-Jérôme.
This lake receives the fresh water of the river, but also receives the salt water of the Saint Lawrence during high tides.

The river enter the Johan-Beetz Bay, an arm of the Gulf of Saint Lawrence, in the municipality of Baie-Johan-Beetz, in the Minganie Regional County Municipality.
The village of Piastrebaie at the river's mouth was founded around 1860 by Joseph Tanguay and his wife Marguerite Murdock, who made their living by fishing for salmon.
The present inhabitants are still mainly engaged in fishing and hunting.
The village and bay were renamed in 1918 after the Belgian naturalist Johan Beetz.
In 1898 Beetz had an imposing 12-room wooden house built on a rocky prominence looking over the Piashti River.
The doctor's "castle" was classified as a historical monument in 1979.
There is a hiking trail from the village to the falls on the river.

Name

The name "Piashti" originally applied only to the bay, and was later used for the river and the lakes.
It means "dry bay", and perhaps refers to the fact that the bay is only accessible at high tide for vessels of average draft.
The 1685 map by Jean-Baptiste-Louis Franquelin shows "Piastebe" as a place frequented by the Innu.
In 1908 Eugène Rouillard sometimes wrote "Rivière Piasthi Bay" or "Rivière Piashbe Bay. 
The 1913 Regional Map of the North Shore of the Gulf of St. Lawrence named it "Piashtibaie River".
In 1914 the Geography Commission used the form "Piashtih" for the bay.

Description
According to the Dictionnaire des rivières et lacs de la province de Québec (1914),

Environment

A map of the ecological regions of Quebec shows the river in sub-regions 6j-T and 6m-T of the east spruce/moss subdomain.

The north of the Piashti valley has potential for use by moose (Alces alces), and traces of moose were found in the region in 1978 and 1979.
Lake Salé has large beds of aquatic grass, and is frequented by several species of seabirds.
A banding station for migratory birds operated at Lake Salé until 2004, and held the record for  the highest concentration of green-winged teal (Anas carolinensis) in North America.
Birds of prey include the merlin (Falco columbarius) and bald eagle (Haliaeetus leucocephalus).

The river has clear water and a bed of dark-colored gravel and large pebbles.
The last  are accessible to Atlantic salmon (Salmo salar).
Other species of fish are brook trout (Salvelinus fontinalis), Arctic char (Salvelinus alpinus), landlocked salmon and American eel (Anguilla rostrata).
Baie-Johan-Beetz Outfitter has exclusive fishing rights to Lake Salé and the Piashti River. 
There are eight pools where salmon may be caught from a boat or wading.

In May 2015 the Ministry of Forests, Wildlife and Parks of Quebec announced a sport fishing catch-and-release program for large salmon on sixteen of Quebec's 118 salmon rivers.
These were the Mitis, Laval, Pigou, Bouleau, Aux Rochers, Jupitagon, Magpie, Saint-Jean, Corneille, Piashti, Watshishou, Little Watshishou, Nabisipi, Aguanish and Natashquan rivers.
The Quebec Atlantic Salmon Federation said that the measures did not go nearly far enough in protecting salmon for future generations.
In view of the rapidly declining Atlantic salmon population catch-and-release should have been implemented on all rivers apart from northern Quebec.

Notes

Sources

Rivers of Côte-Nord